USS Paul G. Baker has been the name of more than one United States Navy ship, and may refer to:

 , a destroyer escort cancelled in 1944
 , a destroyer escort in commission from 1944 to 1947

United States Navy ship names